Game score is a metric devised by Bill James as a rough overall gauge of a starting pitcher's performance in a baseball game. It is designed such that scores tend to range from 0–100, with an average performance being around 50 points.

Formula
To determine a starting pitcher's game score:
Start with 50 points.
Add one point for each out recorded, so three points for every complete inning pitched.
Add two points for each inning completed after the fourth.
Add one point for each strikeout.
Subtract two points for each hit allowed.
Subtract four points for each earned run allowed.
Subtract two points for each unearned run allowed.
Subtract one point for each walk.

History
James first introduced game score in the  edition of his Baseball Abstract. He called it "a kind of garbage stat that I present not because it helps us understand anything in particular but because it is fun to play around with."

Other versions
James has noted that there are cases in which his original version of game score does not accurately reflect a pitcher's performance.

In a September 2003 article in Baseball Prospectus, Dayn Perry created an updated formula based on the ideas behind defense-independent pitching statistics, named Game Score 2.0.

In December 2014, statistician Tom Tango made another attempt at updating the formula, which he also called "Game Score Version 2.0". This version applies a base of 40 points to starting pitchers' game scores (instead of 50), adjusts the point values of certain in-game events, and introduces a penalty for giving up home runs into the equation. Game Score Version 2.0 is the variant displayed on MLB.com. According to James, the original version of game score correlates more closely with team winning percentage and ERA than Tango's version.

Highest achieved scores

The highest game score for a nine-inning game in the major leagues is 105, achieved by Kerry Wood for the Chicago Cubs against the Houston Astros on May 6, 1998, in just his fifth major league start. Wood's performance included 20 strikeouts, zero walks, and just one hit.

The second highest nine-inning game score is 104, which occurred on October 3, 2015, when Max Scherzer of the Washington Nationals allowed no hits and no walks, striking out 17, against the New York Mets. This is also the highest game score ever for a major league no-hitter.

The 100th game score of 100 points or higher was pitched by Matt Cain in June 2012. Of the 100 such games, only ten of them were a regulation nine innings. Higher scores have been accomplished in extra-inning games. The two highest game scores ever recorded both occurred in the same game: the famous 26-inning duel from 1920, Joe Oeschger scored 153 and Leon Cadore scored 140.  Oeschger had earlier scored a 102 in a 14-inning game in 1917 against Jeff Pfeffer, who scored 114. Oeschger's record in these games was 0–0, because both ended in ties and were called by darkness. In all, there have been nine games in which both starting pitchers scored 100 points; all required extra innings and none has occurred since 1971. Juan Marichal and Warren Spahn scored 112 and 97, respectively, during a complete game 16-inning match up; Spahn's score fell below 100 because of Willie Mays' game-winning home run in the bottom of the 16th.

Twenty-one pitchers with 100 or more game score points did so in losing games, including Harvey Haddix, who scored a 107 for the game in which he took a perfect game into the 13th inning. The highest-ever losing game score was 118, from Art Nehf, who outlasted the opposing starter by six innings but lost in the 21st inning. Seventeen of the 100+ game scores came in suspended tie games. Only seven of the 100 highest game scores were no-hitters.

Walter Johnson and Nolan Ryan had the most 100-point game scores with four apiece. Johnson had two in 1918, one in 1919, and a fourth in 1926; Ryan's came in 1972, 1973, 1990 and 1991. Warren Spahn had three 100-point game scores, in 1948, 1952 and 1960. Juan Marichal had three 100-point game scores, in 1963, 1966 and 1969. Eight pitchers had two 100-point game scores:  Art Nehf (1917 and 1918), Joe Oeschger (1917 and 1920), Burleigh Grimes (1918 and 1920), Eric Erickson (1918 and 1921), Herb Pennock (1923 and 1925), Jim Maloney (1964 and 1965), Frank Tanana (1975 and 1976), and Max Scherzer (both 2015).

Corey Kluber's game score of 98 in an eight-inning, no-run, one-hit, no-walk, 18-strikeout performance against the St. Louis Cardinals on May 13, 2015, is the highest by any pitcher in MLB history in a non-complete game. Indians bench coach Brad Mills removed him after the eighth inning, and Cody Allen pitched the ninth inning to seal a 2–0 win. The previous holder of the record was Matt Harvey, who achieved a game score of 97 for a nine-inning non-complete game against the Chicago White Sox on May 7, 2013. (Harvey's New York Mets won in ten innings.)

On June 18, 2014, Clayton Kershaw posted the second highest ever game score for a nine-inning, no-hit effort. Kershaw struck out 15 while walking none, and the only baserunner was the result of a throwing error. His game score of 102 is the third-highest for a nine-inning game in MLB history (50 + 27 + 10 + 15).

The lowest game score in baseball's modern era was Allan Travers' 26-hit, 24-run start for the Detroit Tigers on May 18, 1912. His game score was a −52. This performance only came about because the regular Tiger players staged a strike in protest of Ty Cobb's suspension. To avoid a forfeit, local college players (including Travers) were enlisted as impromptu fill-ins. The lowest game score since 1957 was Oakland pitcher Mike Oquist's, who allowed 16 hits and 14 earned runs in five innings on August 3, 1998, for a −21.

In terms of high scores, the system favors current pitchers in some ways. It is difficult to achieve a very high score in a game without amassing a substantial number of strikeouts. In earlier eras, even for the very best pitchers, strikeouts were less plentiful. For instance, Cy Young's two no-hitters earned scores of just 90 and 88 due to their low strikeout totals (three and two, respectively). However, most of the all-time high game scores occurred in baseball's earlier era, when starting pitchers were permitted to remain in games longer than today; four of the top six all-time game scores were accomplished in stints of 21 innings or more.

The highest game score in a nine-inning game in Nippon Professional Baseball history is 106, which Rōki Sasaki achieved on April 10, 2022 by pitching a perfect game with a league record-tying 19 strikeouts.

Game scores of 100 in a 9-inning MLB game
Sixteen times in Major League Baseball history, a pitcher has achieved a game score of 100 or higher in a 9-inning game, as detailed here.

Career totals for some pitchers
The total number of game scores listed for each pitcher are starts in which he reached 90 points or higher. The parenthetical totals represent the highest score in the pitcher's career, and the number of game scores equal to or greater than 100 (if any). This is not a complete list and includes only pitchers with five or more games of 90 or higher (through 10/9/2015).

Nolan Ryan      31  (101, 4)
Randy Johnson      20  (100, 1)
Sandy Koufax    18  (101, 1)
Tom Seaver    16  (106, 1)
Bob Gibson    14  (100, 1)
Gaylord Perry  13  (112, 1)
Roger Clemens   13  (99)
Jim Maloney  12  (106, 2)
Pedro Martínez     12  (98)
Sam McDowell   11  (100, 1)
Steve Carlton   11  (98)
Bert Blyleven  11  (97)
Jim Bunning    10  (97)
Bob Feller 10
Walter Johnson 10
Warren Spahn  9 (102, 3)
Mike Mussina   9  (98)
Dean Chance   8  (116, 3)
Carl Hubbell 8
Juan Marichal   8  (112, 3)
Clayton Kershaw  8  (102, 1)
Dennis Eckersley   8  (98)
Mickey Lolich   8  (92)
Frank Tanana     7  (105, 2)
Justin Verlander    7 (100, 1)
Bill Singer     7  (97)
Joe Coleman     7  (93)
Johnny Vander Meer 7
Dazzy Vance 7
Billy Pierce    7  (100, 1)
Hal Newhouser  7  (92)
Madison Bumgarner 6 (98)
Virgil Trucks     6  (103, 1)
Curt Schilling    6  (100, 1)
Don Drysdale    6  (100, 1)
David Cone       6  (99)
Hideo Nomo       6  (99)
Don Sutton     6  (98)
Mike Scott     6  (98)
Roy Halladay  6 (98)
Bob Veale  6 (97)
Jerry Koosman  6 (97)
Chris Carpenter 6 (94)
John Smoltz  6 (93)
Juan Pizarro  6 (92)
Mike Cuellar  5  (101, 1)
Gary Peters    5  (98)
Jason Schmidt    5  (97)
Robin Roberts     5  (96)
Curt Simmons     5  (95)
Ray Culp     5  (95)
Ron Guidry     5  (95)
Aníbal Sánchez  5 (94)
Ferguson Jenkins 5 (94)
Kevin Brown    5   (94)
Milt Pappas 5 (94)
Dwight Gooden 5  (93)
Jim Palmer     5  (93)
Camilo Pascual     5  (92)
Dave Stieb     5  (92)
Pete Harnisch     5  (92)
James Shields 5 (94)
Allie Reynolds 5 (92)
Dolf Luque 5
Bullet Joe Bush 5
Grover Cleveland Alexander 5

Theoretical maximum scores

The maximum possible game score in a nine-inning game while allowing no baserunners is 114, possible only if a pitcher goes nine innings while striking out every batter he faces and facing three batters per inning. The pitcher receives 50 to begin with, and loses no points because there are no hits, walks, or runs of any kind. He receives 27 points for the 27 outs, and 10 points for five innings completed after the fourth inning, for a total of 87. In this "perfect score" scenario, the pitcher would have to strike out every hitter he faced, netting him an additional 27 points, for a grand total of 114.

The absolute maximum possible score requires the extremely unlikely scenario in which three base runners reach base each inning on wild pitches or passed balls on third strikes. If this were to happen such that no one scored, and the pitcher recorded all outs by strikeout, a pitcher could theoretically record six strikeouts per inning, and thus 54 for the game, netting him 54 points in addition to the 87 he would have received as described above, for a total of 141.

References

Pitching statistics
Bill James